Azerbaijan was to participate in the Turkvision Song Contest 2016 which would have taken place in Istanbul, Turkey. Azad Azerbaijan TV (ATV) was responsible for organising their entry for the contest. Sevinc Beyaz won the national final, Azerbaycan`ın Sesi, on 29 September, earning the right to represent Azerbaijan in the contest. The contest was postponed and later cancelled on 15 February 2017 after a lack of information from the organisers.

Background

Prior to the 2016 contest, Azerbaijan had participated in the Junior Eurovision Song Contest three times since its first entry in 2013, winning the contest in 2013 with the song "Yaşa" performed by Farid Hasanov. In 2015, Mehman Tagiyev represented the nation with the song "Istanbul", placing seventh with 155 points. The Azerbaijani broadcaster, Azad Azerbaijan TV (ATV), broadcasts the event within Azerbaijan and organizes the selection process for the nation's entry. ATV confirmed their intentions to participate at the 2016 Turkvision Song Contest on 29 March 2016. Azerbaijan has selected their entries for the Turkvision Song Contest through national finals in the past.

Before Turkvision

Selection process

On 29 March 2016, it was announced that the artist would be selected through a selection process titled Azerbaycan`ın Sesi as had been done since 2014. ATV made a call for submissions to participate on 29 March 2016. On 15 June, the names of the four Azerbaycan`ın Sesi judges were revealed to be Elza Seyidcahan, Naile Mirmmedli, Samir Djafarov and Teymur Amrah. Azerbaycan`ın Sesi first took place on 1 July, with contestants being assigned to teams mentored by each judge. The semi-final took place on 23 September 2016 with only six of the twelve remaining contestants advancing to the final.

Final

The final took place on 29 September 2017, with a televote being used to determine the winner of the contest and representative at the Turkvision Song Contest 2016. The final also featured a guest appearance by performer Nihad Melik. One of Elza Seyidcahan's contestants, Sevinc Beyaz, won the final, earning the right to represent Azerbaijan in the Turkvision Song Contest 2016.

At Turkvision 
Originally, the Turkvision Song Contest was scheduled to take place starting on 14 December 2016 and concluding on 18 December 2016. Following the 2016 Turkish coup d'état attempt which took place in July, communication between broadcasters and the organizers of the contest was limited, and eventually the contest was cancelled so that the Turkvision Song Contest 2017 would be brought forwards to take place in March 2017. The contest was once again shifted to take place during Expo 2017 in Astana, Kazakhstan.

See also 
 Azerbaijan in the Eurovision Song Contest 2016
 Azerbaijan in the Turkvision Song Contest
 Turkvision Song Contest 2016

References

External links 
 Official ATV website

Turkvision
2016